The 21st Iris Awards ceremony, organised by the Academy of Television Arts and Sciences, honoured the best in Spanish television of 2019 and took place at the Nuevo Teatro Alcalá in Madrid on 18 November 2019.

Awards 
The 21st Iris Awards were held on 18 November 2019 at the Nuevo Teatro Alcalá in Madrid, Spain. Hosted by Inés Ballester and Jota Abril, the ceremony was broadcast on LaOtra. Netflix's Money Heist was the night's biggest winner, obtaining the 5 awards it was nominated for. Besides the Iris awards conceded by the academy, the jury's and critics' Iris awards were also delivered during the ceremony. The critics' award was gifted ex-aequo to Cuéntame cómo pasó and Sálvame. The jury's awards were gifted to Toñi Moreno, La Sexta, TVE's Prodigios, CMMedia's Los investigadores, and Victim Number 8. The awards given by the academy are listed as follows:

References 

2019 television awards
2019 in Spanish television
Spanish television awards
2019 in Madrid